Strand Road is an important commercial road in downtown Agrabad, Chattogram, Bangladesh. It is located alongside docks of the Port of Chattogram. The road was developed under British rule in the 19th century.

See also
 Agrabad, the central business district of Chittagong located beside Strand Road
 O R Nizam Road

References

Transport in Chittagong